Tonči Stipanović (born 13 June 1986) is a Croatian sailor. He competed at the 2012 Summer Olympics in the men's laser class, finishing in 4th place. Stipanović won Croatia's first ever sailing Olympic medal when he came second overall to win silver in the men's laser class, at the 2016 Summer Olympics in Rio de Janeiro. He came second overall to win silver in the men's laser class at the 2020 Summer Olympics in Tokyo as well.

Web portal for sailing sailingscuttlebutt.com included him on the list of the Top 10 sailors in laser class of all time.

Orders
Order of Danica Hrvatska with face of Franjo Bučar - 2016

References

1986 births
Living people
Croatian male sailors (sport)
Olympic sailors of Croatia
Sailors at the 2012 Summer Olympics – Laser
Sportspeople from Split, Croatia
Sailors at the 2016 Summer Olympics – Laser
Medalists at the 2016 Summer Olympics
Sailors at the 2020 Summer Olympics – Laser
Medalists at the 2020 Summer Olympics
Olympic silver medalists for Croatia
Olympic medalists in sailing
Mediterranean Games gold medalists for Croatia
Mediterranean Games silver medalists for Croatia
Competitors at the 2009 Mediterranean Games
Competitors at the 2013 Mediterranean Games
Mediterranean Games medalists in sailing
Optimist class sailors